Dr. Morse's Indian Root Pills was one of the most successful and enduring products to be manufactured and marketed in North America as part of the lucrative patent medicine industry, which thrived during most of the 19th and 20th centuries. Its manufacturer claimed the pills contained herbal ingredients that would help "cleanse the blood," as "impurity of the blood" was believed to be the cause of all disease.

History

Dr. Morse's Indian Root Pills have their genesis with the father of William Henry Comstock, Edwin Perkins Comstock (1799–1837) who founded a drug company in New York City sometime before 1833. The Comstock patent medicine business was involved in the sale of a number of successful drugs, including Carlton's Pile Liniment, Oldridge's Balm of Columbia, Kline's Tooth Ache Drops and Judson's Worm Tea. Between 1833 and the time of the acquisition of the rights to Dr. Morse's Indian Root Pills, the company remained under the control of the Comstocks through the additional involvement of Edwin's four brothers:
 Lucius Samuel Comstock, (1806–1876)
 Albert Lee Comstock (1802–1876)
 John Carlton Comstock (1819–1853)
 George Wells Comstock (1820–1889)

The Indian Root Pills were first formulated and manufactured in 1854 by Andrew B. Moore (born around 1821, New York), who was then operating under the name A.B. Moore in Buffalo, New York.  Rights to the pills were then transferred through a number of different business partnerships under the control of Moore involving:

 Andrew Judson White, MD (1824–1898) — paternal uncle of publisher and poet James Terry White (1845–1920)
 Baldwin Lake Judson (1832–1867), son of Edwin's sister
 George Wells Comstock
 William Henry Comstock

These reorganizations all occurred amid numerous disputes and lawsuits. During that long period of instability, the manufacturing operations moved from Buffalo to New York City and then to dual sites on opposite sides of the St. Lawrence River, one at Brockville, Ontario, and the other at Morristown, New York. Ownership of Dr. Morse's Indian Root Pills finally stabilized in 1867 when it settled solely in the hands of William Henry Comstock, and thereafter business was carried out under the name W.H. Comstock Co. Ltd.

When William Henry Comstock died in 1919, control of the company passed to his son, William Henry Comstock II (1897–1959), known as "Young Bill." A year after William Henry Comstock II died, his widow liquidated the company, selling the assets and patents to Milburn Medicine Company.

The subsidiary in Australia — W.H. Comstock Company Pty Ltd — had been headed by the former branch manager for the Comstocks. He acquired the rights for Australia and the Orient following the dissolution of the Canadian firm. The Australian firm distributed in New Zealand, Singapore, and Hong Kong up until 1992. Packaging and directions are now modern, the pills being described as "The Overnight Laxative with the Tonic Action", but a reproduction of the old label and the facsimile signature of William Henry Comstock, Sr. were still portrayed.

The W.H. Comstock Co (Aust) Pty Ltd had registered in New South Wales as an Australian Proprietary Company, by Limited Shares, on July 31, 1971, but deregistered on February 27, 1992.

Succession of manufacturers in the 1800s 

Manufacturing & distribution in Australia

 Dr. Morse's Indian Root Pills and Comstock's Worm Tablets are still manufactured and sold by the W.H. Comstock Company Pty. Ltd., in Australia. The company was once a subsidiary of the Brockville, Canada.  It is headed by the former branch manager for the Comstocks, who acquired the rights for Australia and the Orient following the dissolution of the Canadian firm.

 The Australian firm distributes in New Zealand, Singapore, and Hong Kong. Packaging and directions are now modern, the pills being described as "The Overnight Laxative with the Tonic Action," but a reproduction of the old label and the facsimile signature of William Henry Comstock, Sr., are still being portrayed. Thus, the Indian Root Pills have been manufactured continuously for at least 115 years and the Comstock business, through the original and successor firms, has survived for nearly 140 years.

 The W.H. Comstock Co (Aust) Pty Ltd. had registered in New South Wales as an Australian Proprietary Company, by Limited Shares, on July 31, 1971, but deregistered on February 27, 1992.

References 

General references
 Morse's Indian Root Pill — Almanac, W.H. Comstock, Morristown, New York 
 History of the Comstock Patent Medicine Business and Dr. Morse's Indian Root Pills, (alternate link to text) (another alternate link to text) by Robert B. Shaw, Smithsonian Institution Press, Washington, D.C. (1972)  
 An Annotated Catalogue of the Edward C. Atwater Collection of American Popular Medicine and Health Reform, Vol. III, Supplement: A–Z, compiled and annotated by Christopher T. Hoolihan (born 1949), University of Rochester Press, pg. 165 (2008) 
 William H. Comstock Company papers, University of Rochester
Inline citations

Patent medicines